Kabiruddin Kalim (1870 to 1952) was an Indian author, writer and social activist during the period of the Bhopal State.

Biography
Kabiruddin Kalim was born in 1870. He belongs to a strong family history. His younger brother Zakiruddin Zaki was also an author.

Kalim was Bay'ah with Nizamuddin Husain, Sajjada nashin and Shah Neyaz Barelvi. He died in 1952 in Bhopal,

Life as scholar
He authored more than two dozen books. His first Pen name was 'Mahir' and then adopted 'Kalim'. Apart from poems and novels, there are books on religion also. Most of his unpublished work was preserved with his son, Badrul Hasan. Following is the list of books that he authored.

 Minhajul Nabi Tafsir Sura Al Azha (Manzoom), 20 November 1923.
 Aina-e Islam (Manzoom), 23 March 1951
 Haqaiq Sura Bani Israil (Nasr), 19 November 1932
 Mahtab Nabuwat, 4 November 1948
 Miladun Nabi (Nasr)
 Badrul duja fi Ahwal Mustafa, 2 November 1941
 Mawazna Jung-i Uhad wa Maarka Karbala (Manzoom), 15 February 1922
 Hungama Fitrat Mukhzan Fitrat (Haqeeqat Waqeyat Karbala, Nasr)
 Haqiqatus Saman (Nasr), 16 September 1938
 Ghazliat Kalim
 Khamsa Jaat wa Musaddas
 Ganjina-i Kalim (Talatim Fitrat), 18 February 1952
 Masnavi Toor Kalim (Qissa Mah wa Khursheed), 10 February 1937
 Naghmat Hindi (Hindi Kalam)
 Dewaan-e-Kalim
 Kashmakash-e-Hayat (Manzoom), 13 October 1947
 Khuwab Jawani Maruf Ram Kahani (Manzoom), 11 November 1923
 Aqsaamul Insan (Nasr), 10 November 1925
 Muhabbat ka Phal, 3 March 1943
 Khuda ka Chor
 Husn Nadira, 15 September 1943
 Shrimati Chandrama, 4 April 1943
 Zaheer wa Zahra, 13 September 1943
 Josh Khoon, 3 May 1943
 Kismat ka Khel (2 parts)
 Dastan Aaina Jahan (Qissa Shahzada Badiuzzaman), 18 September 1944
 Shareer Mangetar, 24 January 1951
 Afsana Andalib Zaman wa Kishwar Jahan, Three Parts (1951–1952).
 Nasihatul Muslimeen (Musaddas Kabiruddin).

See also
 Ghulam Mansoor
 Ghulam Ahmad Faroghi
 Zakiruddin 'Zaki'

References

19th-century Indian Muslims
Writers from Bhopal
1870 births
1952 deaths
People from Tijara
Urdu-language novelists
Urdu-language poets from India
Urdu-language writers
19th-century Indian novelists
19th-century Indian poets
20th-century Indian novelists
20th-century Indian poets
Novelists from Madhya Pradesh
Poets from Madhya Pradesh